Narasimhaiengar Mukunda (born 25 January 1939, New Delhi, India) is an Indian theoretical physicist.

Mukunda's higher education began at Delhi University, where he was granted a B.Sc. (Hon) degree in 1953. For his Ph.D. he studied at University of Rochester with E. C. G. Sudarshan and graduated in 1964. Mukunda’s thesis dealt with Hamiltonian mechanics, symmetry groups and elementary particles. He also studied group theory at Princeton University with Valentine Bargmann, including topological groups and Lie theory.

He was a post-doctoral fellow at Syracuse University before he returned to India. In 1967, he became a Fellow at Tata Institute of Fundamental Research. In 1969 he transferred to IISc, Bangalore. From 1972 to 2001 he served as professor at the Center for Theoretical Studies. Using the notes from Bargmann's lectures, Mukunda contributed chapters on Lie groups to Classical Dynamics: a modern perspective that he authored with Sudarshan in 1974. The expression of symmetries on physics rests largely on Lie groups, and his later works exploit these classical groups for physical theory. Mukunda was particularly impressed by W. R. Hamilton's "theory of turns" (versors), and worked to extend the use of turns in Sp(2), SU(1,1) and the Lorentz group. In 1989 Mukunda, Rajiah Simon and Sudarshan published "Hamilton’s theory of turns and a new geometrical representation for polarization optics" which developed the coset space SU(2)/U(1) = S3/S1 as an alternative to the Poincaré sphere in the description of light polarization.

Mukunda and collaborators initiated the "Quantum theory of charged-particle beam optics" in 1989 by working out the focusing action of a magnetic quadrupole using the Dirac Equation.

Mukunda is an honorary professor at IISER Bhopal, IISER Mohali and IISER Thiruvananthapuram. He is also the Distinguished associate of Ramakrishna Mission Vivekananda Educational and Research Institute.

He was awarded the Shanti Swarup Bhatnagar Award for work in Nonlinear and Quantum Optics in 1980  In 2016 Mukunda gave the Fifteenth Memorial V.G. Kulkarni Lecture: "The Nature of Scientific Knowledge: some reflections".

Selected publications
According to Mathematical Reviews, Mukunda contributed to 143 scholarly publications, including
 1974: (with George Sudarshan) Classical Dynamics: a modern perspective, John Wiley & Sons 
 1987: "The mathematical style of modern physics", pages 1 to 20 in Recent Developments in Theoretical Physics, World Scientific 
 1989: (with Rajiah Simon and Sudarshan) "Hamilton's theory of turns generalized to Sp(2,R)", Physical Review Letters 62(12): 1331–4 
 1989: (with R. Simon and George Sudarshan) "The theory of screws: a new geometric representation for the group SU(1,1"), Journal of Mathematical Physics 30(5): 1000–1006  
 1989: (with R. Simon and George Sudarshan) "Hamilton's turns and a new geometrical representation for polarization optics", Pramana 32(6): 769–92.
 1989: (with R. Jagannathan, Rajiah Simon & E.C.G. Sudarshan) "Quantum theory of magnetic electron lenses based on the Dirac equation", Physics Letters A 134(8/9): 457  bibcode = 1989PhLA..134..457J pdf
 1992: (with R. Simon) "Hamilton's turns and geometric phase for two-level systems", Journal of Physics A 25(22): 6135–44 
 1993: Twisted Gaussian Schell-model beams. I & II. Symmetry structure and normal-mode spectrum via Indian Academy of Sciences
 1996: "Planetary Motions and the Birth of Classical Mechanics", Current Science 71(7): 527–32 
 1997: "Geometry, Fields, and Cosmology", Fundamental Theories of Physics 88, Kluwer  (from First Inter-University Graduate School on Gravitation and Cosmology held in Pune, 1989)
 1999: "Mathematics and the Physicist's Conception of Nature", Current Science 76(5): 634–9 
 2006: (with R. Simon, S. Chaturvedi, and V. Srinivasan) "Hamiltion's Turns for the Lorentz Group", International Journal of Theoretical Physics 45(11): 2051–2070 
 2010: (with Sunil Mukhi) Lectures on Advanced Mathematical Methods for Physicists, World Scientific,   (Mukunda wrote part 2: Group Theory and Structure and Representations of Compact, Simple Lie Groups and Algebras.)
 2017: (with Arvind and Chaturvedi) "Global aspects of polarization optics and coset space geometry", Physics Letters A 381(35): 3005–9

References

20th-century Indian physicists
Living people
Indian theoretical physicists
University of Rochester alumni
Academic staff of the Indian Institute of Science
1939 births
Academic staff of Ramakrishna Mission Vivekananda Educational and Research Institute